Brian Bruya (born 22 December 1966), is a professor of philosophy at Eastern Michigan University, and an author of books and articles in the fields of comparative philosophy, cognitive science, and educational psychology.  Bruya is known for his work in the study of "effortless attention", and showing that it is possible to foster wisdom in an educational setting.  He is also a translator and has published translations of a number of popular comic books on Chinese philosophy, which have been featured in The New York Times.

Education
Bruya earned a B. A. (Philosophy; Chinese Language & Literature) from the University of Washington in 1992. He went on to the University of Hawaiʻi at Mānoa, earning an M. A. (Philosophy) in 1999 and Ph.D. (Philosophy) in 2004.

References

External links

Profile: Brian Bruya, Eastern Michigan University
Brian Bruya, Fulbright Scholar Program

1966 births
Eastern Michigan University faculty
American philosophy academics
Living people
University of Washington College of Arts and Sciences alumni
University of Hawaiʻi at Mānoa alumni